Opercularia ampluscolonia is a species of freshwater, colonial, sessiline peritrich ciliates. This species produces a branched stalk that is often delicately striate in a longitudinal direction. There can be more than ninety-seven zooids per branched stalk. Zooids reproduce asexually and form dense clusters at the ends of each branch. This filter-feeding protist inhabits ponds in Mendocino County, California.

References 

http://starcentral.mbl.edu/microscope/portal.php?pagetitle=classification&BLOCKID=9&CHILDID=3394
http://www.eol.org/pages/4743
http://taxonomicon.taxonomy.nl/TaxonList.aspx?subject=Taxon&by=ScientificName&search=opercularia*

External links 
http://starcentral.mbl.edu/eutree_workshop/protistiary/index.htm
http://www.microbes.info/
http://serc.carleton.edu/microbelife/index.html
https://web.archive.org/web/20091130123217/http://starcentral.mbl.edu/microscope/portal.php?pagetitle=index

Oligohymenophorea